Institut Agro Rennes-Angers (previously named as Agrocampus Ouest till 2020) is a French higher education institution, known as a grande école. Its official name is Institut supérieur des sciences agronomiques, agroalimentaires, horticoles et du paysage (English: Higher Institute for agricultural sciences, food industry, horticulture and landscape management). It operates under the supervision of the French Ministry of Agriculture.

It trains agricultural sciences engineers and research scientists. It has two campuses in western France, one in Rennes and the other in Angers.

History 
Agrocampus Ouest was created in 2008, as the merger of two institutions:
 Institut National d'Horticulture et de Paysage in Angers.
 Agrocampus Rennes in Rennes.
Its head office is located in Rennes, and has a second campus in Angers.

Education programmes 
Agrocampus Ouest mainly trains engineers (Msc level), 4 specializations being available:
 agricultural sciences engineer
 horticulture sciences engineer
 landscape sciences engineer
 food industry sciences engineer
Depending on the chosen specialization, trainings are held in one or the other campus. Agrocampus Ouest also offers 16 Master's degrees and 9 Bachelor's degrees in life sciences.

Moreover, Agrocampus Ouest has 6 doctoral schools:
 Life-Agro-Health (VAS: Vie-Agro-Santé)
 Plants, environment, health (VESAM: Végétal, environnement, santé, Anjou-Maine)
 Materials science (SDLM: Sciences de la matière)
 Human sciences, organizations and society (SHOS: Sciences humaines, organisation et société)
 Mathematics, telecommunications, informatics, signal, systems, electronics (Matisse: Mathématiques, télécommunications, informatique, signal, systèmes, électronique)
 Law, economy, management, environment, society and territories (DEGEST: Droit, économie, gestion, environnement, société et territoires)

The institution has 80 academic partnerships across the world.

Research programmes 
According to its website, Agrocampus Ouest has:
 14 research units, generally in partnership with the INRA research institute
 398 associated researchers.

Rankings 
According to the 2011 ranking published by the L'Etudiant and L'Expansion, Agrocampus Ouest is the third French grande école for agricultural sciences, with ENSA de Toulouse.

References

See also 
List of agricultural universities

Grandes écoles
Engineering universities and colleges in France
Agronomy schools